Horvathiolus superbus is a species of seed bug in the family Lygaeidae, found in the Palearctic.

Subspecies
These seven subspecies belong to the species Horvathiolus superbus:
 Horvathiolus superbus beieri (Wagner, 1956)
 Horvathiolus superbus confluens (Horvath, 1916)
 Horvathiolus superbus conjunctus (Mancini, 1952)
 Horvathiolus superbus erythropus (Horvath, 1916)
 Horvathiolus superbus kolenatii (Horvath, 1916)
 Horvathiolus superbus romanus (Stichel, 1957)
 Horvathiolus superbus superbus (Pollich, 1783)

References

External links

 

Lygaeidae